Boulder Lake is an alpine lake in Custer County, Idaho, United States, located in the White Cloud Mountains in the Sawtooth National Recreation Area.  The lake is in the Big Boulder Lakes Basin, and is accessed from Sawtooth National Forest trails 601 and 680.

Boulder Lake is just east of D. O. Lee Peak and near several other lakes including Cove, Gentian, Snow Lakes.

References

See also
 List of lakes of the White Cloud Mountains
 Sawtooth National Recreation Area
 White Cloud Mountains

Lakes of Idaho
Lakes of Custer County, Idaho
Glacial lakes of the United States
Glacial lakes of the Sawtooth National Forest